Thomas Sanders Dupuis, Mus. Doc. (1733–1796) was a composer and organist of French extraction, born in London. He succeeded William Boyce at the Chapel Royal, and was regarded as one of the best organists of his day.

His published work includes Nine Voluntaries for the Organ, performed before their Majesties at the Chapel Royal, St. Paul's Cathedral, etc.

Life
He was the third son of John Dupuis, a member of a Huguenot family who is said to have held an appointment at court. Dupuis was born 5 November 1733, and was brought up as a chorister in the Chapel Royal under Bernard Gates and John Travers. On 3 December 1758 he was elected a member of the Royal Society of Musicians.

By 1773 Dupuis was organist of the Charlotte Street Chapel (now St. Peter's Chapel), near Buckingham Palace, and on the death of Boyce he was elected (24 March 1779) organist and composer to the Chapel Royal. On 26 June 1790 Dupuis accumulated the degrees of Mus.Bac. and Mus.Doc. at Oxford. In the same year he originated a sort of musical club, known as the Graduates' Meeting.

Dupuis died at King's Row, Park Lane, 17 July 1796, and was buried in the west cloister of Westminster Abbey on the 24th. A collection of his cathedral music, in 3 vols., was published after his death by his pupil John Spencer. Prefixed to this work is a portrait.

Family
His wife, who predeceased him, was named Martha Skelton. They had three sons, Thomas Skelton (1766–1795), George (died an infant), and Charles (1770–1824).

References

External links
 

Attribution

English classical composers
Classical composers of church music
English organists
British male organists
1733 births
1796 deaths
18th-century classical composers
18th-century British male musicians
18th-century keyboardists
English male classical composers